Ricardo Manuel Nunes Formosinho (born 9 September 1956) is a Portuguese retired footballer who played as a midfielder, currently manager of Moroccan club Olympique Club de Khouribga.

Playing career
Born in Setúbal, Formosinho spent most of his career with local Vitória Futebol Clube, making his Primeira Liga debut during 1974–75 and finishing the season with only two league appearances. In the following years he became a regular for the Sado River club, scoring a career-best six goals in 26 matches in 1976–77 as it finished in sixth position.

After three years in the top flight, two with Varzim S.C. and one with Amora FC, Formosinho returned to Vitória for a further five campaigns, the last being spent in the Segunda Liga. In the 1987 off-season, the 31-year-old returned to the latter tier and joined S.C. Farense, appearing in 27 games in his first year (one goal) and being relegated in his second.

Formosinho retired from football in June 1991 after one season with another Algarve side, S.C. Olhanense, in division three. He appeared in 286 top-division matches over 14 seasons, netting 20 times.

Coaching career
Formosinho started working as a manager with his last team, acting as player-coach in the 1990–91 season and leading them to promotion to the second tier. For the remainder of the decade he coached in the second and third divisions, attaining another promotion to the former competition in 1999 with Imortal DC.

Formosinho continued working in the same leagues in the 2000s, his biggest achievement being leading F.C. Penafiel to the fifth position in division two 2000–01. In 2003–04 he was also part of José Mourinho's coaching staff at FC Porto, with the campaign ending in national championship and UEFA Champions League conquest.

In the 2004–05 season, Formosinho was in charge of C.D. Santa Clara in the second division, being appointed for the last seven rounds and helping the financially troubled Azores club finally avoid relegation, winning three games, drawing one and losing three. In the following campaign, he returned to his main side Vitória and worked as both technical director and reserve team coach.

Late into the decade, Formosinho also plied his trade in Saudi Arabia and Vietnam; he also worked with Mourinho at Real Madrid in the scouting department. In July 2013, he was sacked as Angola's C.R. Caála manager.

Formosinho was appointed as head coach of Malaysian club Kuala Lumpur FA for the 2015 season, being relieved of his duties after less than three months in charge due to poor results. In the summer of 2016 he again paired with Mourinho, acting as his assistant at Manchester United; in November 2019, they re-joined at fellow English Premier League team Tottenham Hotspur, with Formosinho leaving on 6 August 2020.

In March 2021, Formosinho became manager of Al-Hilal in the Sudan Premier League.

References

External links

1956 births
Living people
Sportspeople from Setúbal
Portuguese footballers
Association football midfielders
Primeira Liga players
Liga Portugal 2 players
Segunda Divisão players
Vitória F.C. players
Varzim S.C. players
Amora F.C. players
S.C. Farense players
S.C. Olhanense players
Portugal youth international footballers
Portugal under-21 international footballers
Portuguese football managers
Liga Portugal 2 managers
S.C. Olhanense managers
União Montemor managers
F.C. Penafiel managers
S.C. Farense managers
C.D. Santa Clara managers
G.D. Chaves managers
Saudi First Division League managers
Khaleej FC managers
Becamex Binh Duong FC managers
Kuala Lumpur City F.C. managers
Al-Hilal Club (Omdurman) managers
Olympique Club de Khouribga managers
Portuguese expatriate football managers
Expatriate football managers in Saudi Arabia
Expatriate football managers in Vietnam
Expatriate football managers in Angola
Expatriate football managers in Malaysia
Expatriate football managers in Sudan
Expatriate football managers in Morocco
Portuguese expatriate sportspeople in Saudi Arabia
Portuguese expatriate sportspeople in Vietnam
Portuguese expatriate sportspeople in Angola
Portuguese expatriate sportspeople in Malaysia
Portuguese expatriate sportspeople in Morocco
Real Madrid CF non-playing staff
Manchester United F.C. non-playing staff
Tottenham Hotspur F.C. non-playing staff
Portuguese expatriate sportspeople in Spain
Portuguese expatriate sportspeople in England